Asti Leku Ikastola (English: Asti Leku College or Asti Leku School) is a Basque private school (private school), created in 1963, located in Biscay, which currently has 1,800 students (approx.) and is one of the largest private schools in the Basque Autonomous Community and in the whole Basque Country.

It is a primary and secondary school and it offers kindergarten, primary education, secondary education, Baccalaureate education and Selectividad (from 2 to 18 years). Nowadays it is one of the private schools most known and prominent in the Basque Country.

The school was created in the Francoist Spain and its objective was to instill the Basque language, the Basque culture and the historical and cultural values of Basque Country.

The owner of the school is the enterprise "Asti Leku co-op" (consumers' co-operative business) and is associated in Ikastolen Elkartea, association of all the Basque Country's co-operative owned private schools.

History 

The school arose in a complex process, through which several private schools of the territory were incorporated until arriving at the great school that is nowadays, a reference in Biscay. Everything arose from the initiative of a group of families, who undertook a long journey in the teaching of Basque by their own private homes. These families wanted to build an innovative educational project, which includes the cultural, social and linguistic values of the Basque Country. Among the promoters of Basque culture, like Sabin Ipiña, Juantxu Beitia, Alejandro Echevarría, Pablo Escudero, José Miguel de Barandiaran ...

It began in 1963 with the creation of the Elai-Alai school in Portugalete. The priest and promoter of Basque folklore and culture, José Miguel de Barandiarán, and Sabin Ipiña were some of the many people involved in the project, they took their first steps in the Francoist Spain, and they have to look for a student in their homes. Soon after, the Bihotz Gaztea school in Santurtzi, the Umeen Etxea children's school in Sestao (in 1968), the Itxaropena school in Trapagaran and the Alkartu school in Barakaldo were created, which were integrated into Asti Leku in the following years and in 1971, the children's schools were unified in the Patronato de Sestao in Sestao.

In 1975 the enterprise Asti Leku S. Coop. (consumers' co-operative business) was created, as holder of the school, at whose first Annual general meeting the first outline of what would be the new school was presented and the land was bought. That design responded to the intention of combining sport, culture, leisure and education and once approved, the advertising campaign was launched throughout Biscay: "Let's see if we can / Denon artean egiten badogu, danona izango da".

In 1978 the school moved to Portugalete and the current Primary Education building was inaugurated. That same year, the first general director of the company and the director of the ikastola were hired. In 1980 the schools Elai-Alai, Repélega (Urepelaga) and Lora-Barri (Portugalete) and Umeen-Etxea (Sestao) entered the Asti-Leku school. In 1982 the school celebrated its first Ibilaldia, and the following year, in 1983, Asti Leku Club became a Sports Society.

In 2006, the school receives the "Quality Silver Q" prize awarded by Euskalit. In 2013, it celebrates the second Ibilaldia, and in addition, its 50th anniversary. In 2014, the Town Planning Agreement was signed with the Municipality of Portugalete, for the expansion of Asti-Leku, and the project "Batxilergo Berria / Nuevo bachillerato" was launched.

Nowadays 
The school has four classes per course (A, B, D, E), with about 100–120 students per course and has, around, 1,900 students in total. The school has kindergarten building, pre-school education building, primary education building, secondary education building, Baccalaureate education building, four football fields, three basketball courts, a pediment, an athletics track, indoor and outdoor parking, three dining rooms, four gyms ...

The school is also the official exam center of Trinity College London ESOL and Cambridge, as well as numerous other projects. With regard to the dining service, the school hires the services of the business Auzo-Lagun S. Coop. (belonging to the Ausolan Group, part of the Erkop Group).

The school is a reference in Biscay and it is known for its good results and qualifications in Selectividad (similar to the A Level, required for university entrance). The school has also been criticized for being considered "elitist and posh" and for expelling bad students from the school.

In July 2019 there was a fire in the Primary Education building.

Notable teachers 

Notable teachers:

 Iñigo Urkullu, politician, President of the Basque Government and President of the EAJ-PNV
 Laura Mintegi, writer, teacher and politician
 Fernando Valgañón, actor and stage director

Notable alumni 

Notable students:

 Ainhoa Basabe, politician, mayor of the City of Sestao
 Aintzane Urkijo, politician, mayor of the City of Santurtzi
 Fernando Valgañón, actor and stage director
 Roberto Berrocal, pianist
 Lohitzune Rodríguez, dancer and choreographer
 Nahikari Rodríguez, actress
 Ivan Jiménez Aira, lawyer and businessperson, managing director of Bizkaia Talent
 Mikel Santiago, novelist
 Xabier Eskurza, footballer
 Ander Alaña, footballer
 Iñaki Goitia, footballer
 Eva Martín, singer

References

External links 

 Basque Government

Basque
Basque Country (autonomous community)